Roman Mykolayovych Kozak (born 16 June 1957) was a candidate in the 2004 Ukrainian presidential election, nominated by the political party "Organization of Ukrainian Nationalists in Ukraine", which he has chaired since 2001. Born on June 16, 1957, he attended Kremenetskogo Forestry College from 1972 to 1976, then served two years in the military. He is a co-author of the book "Scientific Notes of Metropolitan Peter Mogila", and a chair of  the Peter Mogila Scientific Association.
Platforms of his election program included a stiff defense of national interests, and 100 euro monthly support of the families with children.

References

1957 births
Living people
Ukrainian National Forestry University alumni
Organization of Ukrainian Nationalists
Candidates in the 2004 Ukrainian presidential election